Ribonucleoprotein, PTB-binding 1 (also known as RAVER1), is a human gene.

References

Further reading